Tim Moore is an American pop singer and songwriter who recorded four albums for Asylum Records in the 1970s. Moore's songs were praised by critics and admired by a diverse range of peers including Keith Richards, Jimmy Webb, James Taylor and Michael McDonald.

Career

Early bands
A self-taught musician, Moore grew up in Philadelphia, where he went to art school and played his early songs at local coffee houses. His rock career began with DC & the Senators opening arena rock concerts in Philadelphia. He played drums with Woody's Truck Stop, the first band to feature Todd Rundgren. He and a friend started the Muffins, the first group to record and perform Tim Moore pop songs. The Muffins had minor success on RCA Records with the single "Subway Traveler". During its year of existence, the band did one week residencies at the Trauma, a psychedelic club in Philadelphia, with acts like the Velvet Underground.

After the Muffins disbanded, Frank Zappa heard Moore play solo and considered his songs harmonically advanced for the time. Zappa brought Moore to New York with the intention of signing him to his label, Bizarre Records. Moore declined the offer when Zappa couldn't schedule time to produce the album himself. Moore returned to Philadelphia and worked as a staff writer and studio musician on sessions with Thom Bell, Gamble and Huff, and other producers of Philadelphia soul. He lived next door to singer Daryl Hall in downtown Philadelphia, where they worked together as staff writers for a production company. Moore and Hall co-founded a new band, Gulliver, who released one album for Elektra Records.

Solo career
After the breakup of Gulliver, Moore sought a more personal approach to his music. He moved to Woodstock, New York, the residence of Bob Dylan, The Band, and Van Morrison. He signed with Dunhill Records, which issued his first single, "A Fool Like You," on which Donald Fagen of Steely Dan sang backup. In return, Moore sang backup on the first Steely Dan single, "Dallas".

Moore's self titled debut solo album came in 1974 as the first release by a label called A Small Record Company. It was distributed by Paramount and its parent company Famous Music Corp. It was produced by Nick Jameson, who recognized Moore's multi-instrumental talents and encouraged him to assemble his own tracks. Moore layered guitar, keyboard, and bass parts over drum tracks by Bernard Purdie, and Russ Kunkel. The debut single "Second Avenue" charted in the US, Canada, and UK. But as it was headed up the US charts Famous Music closed its record operations.

When record label chiefs Clive Davis and David Geffen heard that Moore was a free agent, a bidding war ensued. Moore chose to sign with Geffen's Asylum Records. Meanwhile Art Garfunkel released a recording of Second Avenue. Garfunkel's version peaked at No. 34 on the Billboard magazine Hot 100 chart, number six Adult Contemporary, and No. 39 in Canada, while Moore's original peaked at No. 58 after re-release. Moore's version made a brief re-appearance of the Canadian charts in early 1978, reaching number 92.

During 1975 Moore released the album Behind the Eyes. This featured what remains his best-known song, "Rock and Roll Love Letter". The song was a hit when re-recorded by the Bay City Rollers a year later. Moore's guitar playing on this song caught the attention of Keith Richards, guitarist for the Rolling Stones. They became friends and Moore spent two weeks in rehearsals with the Rolling Stones and Peter Tosh at Bearsville Studios in Woodstock.

Moore's third album, White Shadows, was recorded in Los Angeles with more polished production and a group of seasoned musicians, including Michael McDonald of the Doobie Brothers, Jeff Porcaro of Toto, Timothy B. Schmit of the Eagles, and Bill Payne of Little Feat. The album was followed by High Contrast, produced by Ken Scott, who had worked with The Beatles,  David Bowie, Devo and Supertramp.

Singers continued to mine his new releases for songs but Moore's records received limited attention in the United States. In 1986 Moore released his fifth album, Flash Forward. He spent 75 days touring Brazil after "Yes," a ballad from that album, rocketed to No.1 and stayed there for ten weeks.

Recent activity
As of 2019, Moore continues to write songs and plans new recording projects and live dates through 2020. He is a polymath and self-directed learner who focuses on social psychology, human behavior and digital-human interfaces. Two major non-fiction books have been in production for over a decade. A memoir is also taking shape. His fine art work will be published as an edition of prints in late 2019. In 2016, he was the music director for an all-star tribute to Lou Reed for the 50th anniversary of Max's Kansas City.

Other versions of Tim Moore songs
"Second Avenue" was recorded by Art Garfunkel and Colin Blunstone; "Rock and Roll Love Letter" by the Bay City Rollers and The Records; "Charmer" by Etta James; "A Fool Like You" by Eric Andersen and Iain Matthews; "Love Enough" by Cher, Siobhan Crawley, Paul Jones, Maxine Nightingale, and Cliff Richard;  "I Think I Want to Possess You" by Maxine Nightingale; "Aviation Man" by Jimmy Witherspoon; "I Got Lost Tonight" by Clifford T. Ward; and "That's the Way I See You/Yes/It Ain't Over 'til It's Over" by Richie Havens; "When You Close Your Eyes" by Colin Blunstone and Nigel Olsson: "I Can Almost See The Light" by Colin Blunstone.

Album discography
 Tim Moore (A Small Record Company, 1974)
 Tim Moore (Asylum, 1974, re-issue)
 Behind the Eyes (Asylum, 1975)
 White Shadows (Asylum, 1977)
 High Contrast (Asylum, 1979)
 Flash Forward (Elektra, 1985)

Singles discography
 "A Fool Like You" (Dunhill/ABC, 1973) -- U.S. #93
 "Second Avenue" (Asylum, 1974) -- U.S. #58; AC #41; CAN #60
 "Charmer" (Asylum, 1975) -- U.S. #91
 "Rock and Roll Love Letter" (Asylum, 1975)
 "In the Middle" (Asylum, 1977) -- U.S. #75;  CAN #89
 "Yes" (Top Tape, 1986) -- Brazil, (Vidisco, 1986 ) -- Portugal #1

References

 David Quentin (liner notes) CD reissues, Airmail Archive, Japan 2004

External links
 [ AllMusic entry]
 

Living people
Songwriters from Pennsylvania
Asylum Records artists
Polydor Records artists
Charisma Records artists
Temple University alumni
People from Woodstock, New York
1949 births